The Unified Socialist Party of Mexico (PSUM) was a socialist political party in Mexico. It later became the Socialist Mexican Party in 1988.

History
The PSUM was founded in November 1981 by the merger of four socialist parties:
The Mexican Communist Party (PCM) - the Mexican affiliate of the Communist International, formed in 1919;
The Movement of Socialist Action and Unity (MAUS) - a split from the PCM that was active in the Mexican Labour movement;
The Party of the Mexican People (PPM) - a split from the Popular Socialist Party (PPS);
The Movement of Popular Action (MAP) - a party involved in campaigns for trade-union democracy and reform in the 1970s.
Before merging to form the PSUM, these four parties had formed an electoral alliance called the Coalition of the Left in 1977.

Though the PSUM was a multi-tendency organization, it generally followed the ideology of Eurocommunism. In 1988, the PSUM changed its name to the Mexican Socialist Party (PMS) after the merging with Mexican Workers' Party. In 1989, following the presidential campaign of Cuauhtémoc Cárdenas, the PMS joined Cárdenas and other dissidents from the Institutional Revolutionary Party to form the Party of the Democratic Revolution (PRD).

Further reading
Barry Carr, "Mexican Communism 1968-1981: Eurocommunism in the Americas?" Journal of Latin American Studies, Vol. 17, No. 1 (May 1985), 201-228.
Dan La Botz, "Mexico’s Labor Movement in Transition," Monthly Review, Vol. 52, No. 2 (June 2005).

Defunct political parties in Mexico
Communist parties in Mexico
Political parties established in 1981
1981 establishments in Mexico
Political parties disestablished in 1987